Pál Adrienn is a 2010 Hungarian drama film directed by Ágnes Kocsis. It was screened in the Un Certain Regard section at the 2010 Cannes Film Festival.

Cast
 Éva Gábor
 István Znamenák
 Ákos Horváth
 Lia Pokorny
 Izabella Hegyi

Awards
 63rd Cannes Film Festival, Un Certain Regard – FIPRESCI Award
 Sarajevo Film Festival – Cinelink: Magic Box Award for the screenplay (2007)
 Jameson Cinefest International Film Festival, Miskolc, Hungary - Film Critics Award
 Arsenals Int. Film Festival, Riga, Latvia - Condamnation of the Interfilm Jury
 Zurich Film Festival – Critics Choice Award
 Cinepécs - Hungary - Film New Europe Visegrád Award 
 2in1 Festival, Moscow – “Prize for the Best Hero(ine)” for the best performance to Éva Gábor
 Manaki Brothers International Cinematographers' Film Festival, Bitola -Award for exceptional artistic achievement in the art of cinematography 
 Cottbus Film Festival – Prize for the Best Director
 Cottbus Film Festival –Prize for an Outstanding actress to Éva Gábor
 Cottbus Film Festival – Prize of the Ecumenical Jury
 The Hungarian Film Critics’ Award for the best director of the year
 The Hungarian Film Critics’ Award for the best cinematography of the year

References

External links

2010 films
2010 drama films
Hungarian drama films
2010s Hungarian-language films